SNTG2 is a syntrophin gene.